Joseph Amos Milburn (April 1, 1927 – January 3, 1980) was an American rhythm-and-blues singer and pianist, popular in the 1940s and 1950s. He was born in Houston, Texas, and died there 52 years later. One commentator noted, "Milburn excelled at good-natured, upbeat romps about booze and partying, imbued with a vibrant sense of humour and double entendre, as well as vivid, down-home imagery in his lyrics."

Life and career
Milburn was born in Houston, one of thirteen children. By the age of five, he was playing tunes on the piano. He enlisted in the United States Navy when he was fifteen and earned thirteen battle stars in the Philippines. He returned to Houston and organized a sixteen-piece band playing in clubs in the city. He was managed by William and Geneva Church.

Milburn was a polished pianist and performer and in 1946 attracted the attention of a woman who arranged a recording session with Aladdin Records in Los Angeles. Milburn's relationship with Aladdin lasted eight years, during which he recorded more than 75 sides. This included his cover version of "Down the Road a Piece" (1946), a blues song with a Texas boogie, that is similar in many respects to rock music. However, none of his recordings were popular until 1949, when seven of his singles got the attention of the R&B audience. "Hold Me Baby" and "Chicken Shack Boogie" reached numbers eight and nine on Billboard'''s survey of 1949's R&B best-sellers.

He became one of the main performers associated with the Central Avenue music scene in Los Angeles. He was also a popular touring artist. He won awards from Down Beat magazine (Best Blues and Jazz Star) and Billboard magazine (Top R&B Artist). Among his best-known songs was "One Scotch, One Bourbon, One Beer". In 1950 his recording of Maxwell Davis' "Bad, Bad Whiskey" reached the top of the R&B record chart. It was the first of a series of drinking songs he recorded (none written by Milburn, but several composed by Rudy Toombs). However, there is no evidence that he had an alcohol problem.

Milburn recorded several more drinking songs through 1952 ("Thinking and Drinking", "Trouble in Mind") and was by then touring the country playing clubs. While touring the Midwest that summer, he announced that he would disband his combo and continue as a solo act. In autumn he joined Charles Brown for a concert tour of the South. For the next few years each of his tours was a series of one-nighters. After three years of solo performing Milburn returned to Houston in 1956 to re-form his band. His releases for Aladdin Records in 1957 did not sell well, and the record company, having its own problems, terminated his contract. He tried to regain commercial success with a few more releases for Ace Records, but his time had passed. Radio airplay was directed at the teenage market.

Milburn contributed two songs to the R&B Yuletide canon: "Let's Make Christmas Merry, Baby", in 1949, for Aladdin Records, and "Christmas (Comes but Once a Year)", in 1960, for King Records. The latter was the B-side of Brown's holiday classic "Please Come Home for Christmas".

Milburn's final recording was for an album by Johnny Otis in 1972, after Milburn had been impaired by a stroke. Otis played the left-hand piano parts for his enfeebled old friend. Milburn had a second stroke, which caused circulatory problems resulting in the amputation of a leg. He died soon after, of a third stroke, at the age of 52.

Another artist performing and recording as Amos Milburn, Jr. in Texas in the 1960s was a different and unrelated person (James Thomas Russ, Jr.).

Legacy
Milburn was an important performer of blues music in the years immediately after World War II.
He was one of the first performers to switch from sophisticated jazz arrangements to the louder jump blues style. He began to emphasize rhythm and technical qualities of voice and instrumentation second.
He was a commercial success for eleven years and influenced many performers. His energetic songs about getting "high" were admired by fellow musicians, such as Little Willie Littlefield, Floyd Dixon and Milburn's prime disciple, Fats Domino. Domino consistently credited Milburn as an influence on his music.

Discography

Selected recordings
 "Amos Blues", 1946
 "Down the Road a Piece", 1947
 "Chicken Shack Boogie", 1948
 "A&M Blues", 1948
 "Bewildered", 1948
 "Hold Me, Baby", 1949
 "In the Middle of the Night", 1949
 "Roomin' House Boogie", 1949
 "Let's Make Christmas Merry, Baby", 1949
 "Bad, Bad Whiskey", 1950
 "Let's Rock A While", 1951
 "Thinkin' and Drinkin", 1952 (written by Rudy Toombs)
 "Trouble in Mind", 1952
 "Let Me Go Home, Whiskey", 1953 (written by Shifty Henry)
 "One Scotch, One Bourbon, One Beer", 1953 (written by Rudy Toombs)
 Rockin' the Boogie, 10-inch LP, 1955

LPs
 Let's Have a Party, 1957, Score Records
 A Million Sellers, 1962, Imperial Records
 The Return of the Blues Boss, 1963, Motown Records

Compilation albums
 The Best of Amos Milburn: Down the Road Apiece, CD, 1994, EMI America Records
 The Complete Aladdin Recordings of Amos Milburn, CD box set, 1994, Mosaic Records
 Blues, Barrelhouse & Boogie Woogie, CD box set, 1996, Capitol Records
 The Best of Amos Milburn, CD, 2001, EMI-Capitol Special Markets
 The Original Blues Sound of Charles Brown & Amos Milburn'', with Jackie Shane and Bob Marshall & the Crystals, LP, 1965, Pickwick/Grand Prix Series, Pickwick International

See also

Blues Hall of Fame
First rock and roll record
Houston National Cemetery
List of artists who reached number one on the Billboard R&B chart
List of blues musicians
List of jump blues musicians
List of keyboardists
List of R&B musicians
List of West Coast blues musicians
Route 66 Records
West Coast blues

References

External links
 Amos Milburn biography
 Expanded biography at Earthlink.net

1927 births
1980 deaths
African-American pianists
American blues pianists
American male pianists
American blues singer-songwriters
American rhythm and blues singers
Singer-songwriters from Texas
Jump blues musicians
Imperial Records artists
Charay Records artists
Ace Records (United States) artists
King Records artists
Motown artists
People from Houston
West Coast blues musicians
Burials at Houston National Cemetery
20th-century American pianists
United States Navy personnel of World War II
African-American male singer-songwriters
20th-century African-American male singers